Sandmann – Historien om en sosialistisk supermann ('Sandmann – the History of a Socialist Superman') is a Norwegian 52-minute-long documentary by Jannicke Systad Jacobsen from 2005. The documentary looks back on the rise and fall of the East-German socialism through the tales of Sandmann of Sandmännchen.

External links 
 Article on Norsk filminstitutt
 

Norwegian documentary films
2005 television films
2005 films
2005 documentary films
Norwegian television films